Haplochromis parorthostoma is a species of cichlid endemic to Lake Victoria where it is known from areas with hard substrates.  This species can reach a length of  SL.

References

parorthostoma
parorthostoma
Fish of Lake Victoria
Taxa named by Humphry Greenwood
Fish described in 1967
Taxonomy articles created by Polbot